Oscar Neftalí Sallaberry Valls (Nefty, born March 1, 1964, in Ponce, Puerto Rico) and Fernando Ramón Sallaberry Valls (born November 25, 1965, in Barcelona, Spain), are Puerto Rican singers and actors who were part of the original lineup of the band Menudo. Nefti and Fernando are the sons of Santiago Sallaberry, a doctor in oncology.

Nefty

Nefty started with Menudo at age 13, and stayed in the group until he was 15. Nefty graduated in 1986 from Marquette University in Computer Sciences. He is an Information Technology Officer (ITO) in a company in Puerto Rico.

Fernando
Fernando started in Menudo at age 12, and was one of the primary voices in the group until he left at age 15. He sang lead vocal on Chiquitita, which became one of Menudo's biggest hits. After he left the group, Fernando became popular as a soloist in Puerto Rico and in South America. He suffers from Neuromuscular disease, a rare condition that has no cure. It is difficult for him to move, and he has needed his family's assistance for the last few years. He continues to gain strength and movement, but is confined to a wheel chair.

XCHANGE
In 1987, 4 of the original 5 Menudo members, Carlos & Ricky Melendez, and Nefty and Fernando Sallaberry reunited on a project they called: XCHANGE. There was some publicity and they recorded a few demos (EP) but were not offered a recording contract. They soon disbanded.

In pop culture 
Fernando and Nefty are played by Guisseppe Miguel Agrelot and by Fabricio Andres Broda Braida, respectively, in the 2020 Amazon Prime Video series based on Menudo, "Subete A Mi Moto".

Discography

With Menudo (Nefty Sallaberry) 
 Los Fantasmas (1977)
 Laura (1978)

With Menudo (Fernando Sallaberry) 
 Los Fantasmas (1977)
 Laura (1978)
 Chiquitita (1979)
 Felicidades (1979)
 Mas Mucho Mas (1980)

References

See also

List of Puerto Ricans
French immigration to Puerto Rico
Menudo

Living people
Sibling musical duos
Menudo (band) members
Singers from Ponce
Puerto Rican people of French descent
20th-century Puerto Rican male singers
Year of birth missing (living people)
Puerto Rican male actors